Jared Scott Fogle (born August 23, 1977) is an American former spokesman for Subway restaurants. Fogle appeared in Subway's advertising campaigns from 2000 to 2015, when he publicly became the subject of a Federal Bureau of Investigation investigation. The FBI probe led to him being convicted of child sex tourism and possessing child pornography.

While a student at Indiana University, Fogle lost  between 1998 and 1999. Having frequented a Subway restaurant as part of his diet plan, he was hired to help advertise the company the following year. Fogle's popularity led to him being featured in over 300 commercials during his 15 years with Subway, alongside other media appearances.

Allegations of Fogle having inappropriate relations with minors began in 2007, but did not gain traction until 2015 when the FBI uncovered that he received child pornography from an associate. Pleading guilty to the child sex tourism and child pornography charges the same year, Fogle was sentenced to 15 years, 8 months in federal prison. In December 2015 he was incarcerated at the Federal Correctional Institution, Englewood.

Early life
Fogle was born in Indianapolis, Indiana, on August 23, 1977, to Norman and Adrienne Fogle. 

In 1995, Fogle graduated from North Central High School in Indianapolis. He graduated from Indiana University Bloomington in 2000 and then worked briefly in the revenue management department at American Trans Air.

Career

Subway campaign
Fogle first came to media attention in April 1999, via an article published in the Indiana Daily Student written by a former dormmate about Fogle losing  by exercising and eating a diet of Subway sandwiches. Subsequently, Fogle was featured in a Men's Health magazine article, "Stupid Diets ... that Work!" According to the article, Fogle had become obese – at one point weighing  – through lack of exercise and eating junk food.

Fogle changed his eating habits upon the switch to eating at Subway, replacing his 10,000 calorie per day food consumption with one small turkey sub and one large veggie sub along with some baked potato chips and diet soda, totalling about 2,000 calories. A Chicago-area Subway franchisee took Fogle's story to Subway's Chicago-based advertising agency.

As a test, the company ran a regional television advertising campaign. The first ad aired on January 1, 2000, introducing Fogle and his story with the following disclaimer: "The Subway diet, combined with a lot of walking, worked for Jared. We're not saying this is for everyone. You should check with your doctor before starting any diet program. But it worked for Jared."

Because the introductory test ads were a success, Fogle subsequently appeared in more television commercials as well as sponsored in-store appearances throughout the United States. He gave talks on the benefits of fitness and healthy eating.

In 2002, Fogle was the subject of an episode of South Park titled "Jared Has Aides". Fogle has stated that while the episode had "typical[ly] tasteless humor", the fact that an entire episode was devoted to him was "very flattering". He added, "you know you've made it when shows like South Park start parodying you". Fogle also appeared in the 2017 video game South Park: The Fractured but Whole as a boss; this occurred after his child pornography conviction.

In February 2008, a Subway campaign called "Tour de Pants" celebrated Fogle maintaining his weight loss for a decade.  As part of the campaign, Fogle made an announcement that he would retire his pair of  pants to a museum at the end of the advertising tour. Beginning in 2008, Fogle's presence in Subway advertisements decreased due to the company's placing a new emphasis on its "$5 Footlong" promotion.

Fogle's role in Subway afforded him some other opportunities, such as appearances in WWE in 2009 and 2011. By 2013, Fogle had filmed more than 300 commercials and continued to make appearances and speeches for the company.  Subway attributed one third to one half of its growth in sales to Fogle, with revenue having tripled from 1998 to 2011.

Fogle made appearances in the Sharknado film series, beginning with Sharknado 2: The Second One. He had a cameo appearance in Sharknado 3: Oh Hell No!, though this was cut from the Syfy Channel broadcast version a week before the premiere when his house was searched by the FBI.

Jared Foundation 
In 2004, Fogle established the Jared Foundation, a nonprofit organization focused on raising awareness about childhood obesity through educational programs and tools provided to parents, schools, and community organizations.

On April 29, 2015, Russell Taylor, director of the Jared Foundation, was arrested at his Indianapolis home on charges of child exploitation, possession of child pornography, and voyeurism. Fogle severed all ties with him immediately following the arrest. Taylor attempted suicide on May 6, 2015, at the Marion County Jail and was placed on life support. Taylor pleaded guilty to the charges on September 1, 2015, and on December 10, 2015, was sentenced to 27 years in federal prison.

In August 2015, a USA Today article reported that the Jared Foundation had not issued any grants nor had it given funds for its stated purpose. The article further noted that, on average, the foundation spent $73,000 a year, with the majority of that figure paying the salary of the foundation's executive director. More than one-quarter of the funds were unaccounted for per the foundation's tax records. The Secretary of State of Indiana dissolved the organization in February 2012 because it did not pay the required $5 annual reporting fees during the two previous years, despite being requested to do so on multiple occasions.

Daniel Borochoff, president of the non-profit charity watchdog group CharityWatch, was quoted by USA Today as saying, "If Jared [were] really interested in helping children through his foundation, he could have gotten more money. As with a lot of celebrities, the charity appears to be more about image-enhancement than charitable deeds."

Legal history

Child pornography investigation and arrest 
In 2007, Fogle came to the attention of state and federal law enforcement agencies after Sarasota, Florida, journalist and radio host Rochelle Herman-Walrond told the Sarasota Police Department he made lewd comments to her about middle school-age girls; she had met Fogle at a local middle school for a health event, as he was in Sarasota for his speaking tour. She made recordings of Fogle's remarks and saved text messages between them, and then went to the Federal Bureau of Investigation (FBI), where agents asked her to record her conversations with him. Herman-Walrond befriended Fogle and for the next four years surreptitiously recorded her conversations with him as part of an ongoing federal investigation. She recorded him making several remarks about having had sex with underage girls and asking her to install a webcam in her children's rooms so he could watch them; ultimately, the FBI could not pursue a case against Fogle using the recordings because they needed more substantive evidence against him.

During the investigation into Russell Taylor's child pornography operation, authorities discovered that Taylor had traded sexually explicit photos and videos of children, some as young as six, with Fogle. Taylor, who was sentenced to 27 years in prison, was later named an unindicted co-conspirator in the FBI's case against Fogle. "What we found in Russell Taylor's home and on his computers led us to Jared Fogle," said Tim Horty, a spokesman for the United States Department of Justice.

On July 7, 2015, the FBI and Indiana State Police investigators raided Fogle's Zionsville, Indiana, residence and arrested him on distribution and receipt of child pornography charges; computers and other electronic equipment were removed from his home. The same day, a spokesperson for Subway announced that the company and Fogle had mutually agreed to suspend their business relationship; subsequently, Subway removed all references to Fogle from its website.

Following Fogle's arrest, the FBI also subpoenaed a series of text messages made in 2008 between Fogle and Subway franchisee Cindy Mills, with whom he was having a sexual relationship at the time. In these messages, Fogle talked about sexually abusing children ranging in age from nine to 16, told her to sell herself for sex on Craigslist, and asked her to arrange for him to have sex with her 16-year-old cousin. Mills's lawyer said that she had alerted Subway's corporate management about the text messages, but that they had responded that because Fogle was not a Subway employee, there was no violation. Subway representatives said they had no record of Mills's allegations.

Plea agreement 
On August 19, 2015, federal prosecutors announced they had reached a deal with Fogle in which he would plead guilty to two counts, one of distribution and receipt of child pornography and one of traveling to engage in illicit sexual conduct with a minor—specifically, from Indiana to New York City, where he is charged with paying to engage in sexual acts with a 17-year-old girl.

Prosecutors alleged that Fogle offered adult prostitutes a finder's fee to find him younger sex partners.

According to documents released by federal prosecutors, Fogle has also agreed to pay a total of $1.4 million in restitution—$100,000 to each victim. Fogle faced up to 50 years in prison had he gone to trial; however, as part of the plea deal—which was not binding on the sentencing judge—prosecutors agreed to seek no more than 12 and a half years. In return, Fogle agreed to a minimum sentence of five years. Soon after the plea deal was announced, Subway announced via Twitter that it had completely severed ties with Fogle. As a condition of his plea deal, Fogle would be restricted to supervised contact or communication with minors upon approval of his probation officer. Supervised visits with his own children would be allowed only with approval of their mother, Fogle's soon-to-be ex-wife Katie McLaughlin. Fogle had already made a request to visit his two children in September, but McLaughlin contested it. Upon release from prison, Fogle will be required to register as a sex offender for the rest of his life and undergo treatment for sexual disorders.

On November 19, 2015, Fogle formally pleaded guilty before federal judge Tanya Walton Pratt. In a statement, Fogle apologized for his crimes, saying that he wanted a chance to become a "good, honest person" and "redeem [his] life" after being ensnared in a life of "deception, lies and complete self-centeredness." According to John Bradford, a forensic psychiatrist who testified for Fogle's defense team, Fogle suffered from a compulsive eating disorder for several years before losing weight, and replaced food with a sense of "hypersexuality," which included "mild" or "weak" pedophilia. That diagnosis was not accepted by experts in the psychiatry field and was criticized by Pratt and on social media. Liberty Behavioral Health Corp. psychologist Adam Deming suggested that Bradford had meant to say that Fogle's primary sexual attraction was to early teenagers, but that he had a lesser attraction to younger children.

Pratt sentenced Fogle to 15 years and 8 months in prison, over three years more than what prosecutors had sought and three times what Fogle had requested. Pratt stated that the "level of perversion and lawlessness exhibited by Mr. Fogle is extreme." Fogle must serve a minimum of 13 years before becoming eligible for time off with good behavior. After serving his sentence, he will be on supervised release for the rest of his life. Pratt also fined him $175,000 and ordered him to forfeit $50,000 in assets (a total of $225,000), in addition to the $1.4 million restitution.

Fogle's lawyer, Ron Elberger, filed a notice of appeal on December 14, 2015. Fogle is able to appeal the sentence since it is longer than the maximum sentence recommended by the prosecutors. The appeal brief was due by January 25, 2016, but Fogle asked for an extension for his appeal after Elberger was diagnosed with cancer. The extension was granted. After the appeal was filed, the U.S. Attorney's office responded by opposing any sentence reduction. The office cited Fogle's text messages to a woman, in which Fogle stated he would "pay you big for a 14 or 15-year-old", and that underage girls are "what I crave". In these text messages, he also expressed sexual interest in young boys.

On June 9, 2016, Fogle's sentence was upheld by the United States Court of Appeals for the Seventh Circuit.

Incarceration 

Fogle's lawyers recommended that he serve his sentence at Federal Correctional Institution, Englewood near Littleton, Colorado; it has a program for sex offenders. Judge Pratt agreed with the recommendations, but she had no authority to determine where Fogle would serve his sentence. On November 21, 2015, Fogle arrived at the Henderson County, Kentucky Detention Center, where he was held on a temporary basis. Fogle entered Federal Bureau of Prisons (BOP) custody, going to Federal Transfer Center, Oklahoma City, on December 15, 2015. Three days later, he was transferred to FCI Englewood. Fogle's BOP number is 12919-028. His earliest possible release date is March 24, 2029.

In March 2016, Fogle was assaulted by another inmate, Steven Nigg (Register No. #10896-089). The attack left Fogle with a bleeding nose, swollen face and scratches on his neck. Nigg was then transferred to the Federal Transfer Center in Oklahoma City, Oklahoma, before being transferred to FCI La Tuna in El Paso County, Texas. On November 8, 2017, Pratt dismissed a motion filed by Fogle who was hoping to overturn his convictions by stating that the federal court did not have jurisdiction to convict him. She also dismissed another motion filed on behalf of Fogle by fellow inmate Frank Pate stating the court did not have jurisdiction because of Fogle's status as a purported "sovereign citizen".

Lawsuits
The parents of one of Fogle's victims filed a lawsuit against Fogle for personal injury and emotional distress. Fogle filed a motion arguing that the parents are actually liable for the injuries because the parents fought and abused alcohol in front of the daughter. On October 24, 2016, Kathleen McLaughlin's lawyers filed suit against Subway in Indiana. The suit alleges that Subway violated McLaughlin's privacy and property rights, and caused personal injury to McLaughlin by covering up at least three instances of Fogle's illegal behavior that were reported to senior management, including the allegation that Subway's senior vice president of marketing hushed up a 2004 incident in which Fogle propositioned a young girl at a promotional event at a Subway franchise in Las Vegas. The lawsuit was dismissed in October 2017, with the judge writing that the court lacked jurisdiction, since their principal business operations were outside Indiana.

Potential for other criminal charges
Fogle potentially faced state charges in New York related to Victims 13 and 14. Potential state crimes included statutory rape and/or trafficking persons for sexual reasons. Fogle's federal plea deal has no standing regarding state charges, so there would have been no double jeopardy had New York opted to pursue a criminal case. However, New York defense attorney and former assistant district attorney Matthew R. Smalls stated that New York State was unlikely to bring state charges since it would have had to mount a new investigation and get testimony from victims. Smalls believed that a prosecutor in New York "would really be tone deaf" to ask Victims 13 and 14 to tell their stories again, let alone testify before another grand jury. Abby Phillip of The Washington Post stated "As a legal matter, Fogle may never be charged with rape – or legally labeled with having committed that crime."

Personal life 

In November 2009, Fogle became engaged to Kathleen McLaughlin, a teacher. In January 2010, People reported that Fogle had gained back  and planned to lose it by way of his Subway weight-loss program for his upcoming wedding. Fogle and McLaughlin married in August 2010 and had two children together: a son (born 2011), and a daughter (born 2013).

In 2013, Fogle had a net worth of $15 million. On August 19, 2015, following Fogle's appearance in federal court on charges of sex with minors and child pornography, his wife released a statement through her attorney announcing that she was seeking a divorce. She added that she was focused "exclusively on the well-being of my children" and would have no further comment. Their divorce was finalized on November 16, 2015; Fogle agreed to pay his now ex-wife $7 million. According to court filings, she had traveled out of state before Fogle's guilty plea, and opted to stay in an undisclosed location to protect herself and the children from the "media circus" surrounding Fogle's crimes.

A three-part documentary film about Fogle and his crimes called Jared from Subway: Catching A Monster was broadcast on the ID pay TV network in March 2023.

Filmography

References

External links

 

 Indictment, United States v. Jared Fogle (Archive)
 Plea Agreement (Archive)
 UNITED STATES DISTRICT COURT SOUTHERN DISTRICT OF INDIANA INDIANAPOLIS DIVISION UNITED STATES OF AMERICA, Plaintiff, v. JARED S FOGLE, Defendant.) Case No. 1:15-cr-00159-TWP-MJD ORDER DENYING MOTION TO CORRECT CLEAR ERROR
 Archived official pages from Subway: "Jared's Tenth" and "All About Jared"

1977 births
Living people
20th-century American Jews
21st-century American businesspeople
21st-century American criminals
21st-century American Jews
Advertising and marketing controversies
American businesspeople convicted of crimes
American male criminals
American male film actors
American people convicted of child pornography offenses
American people convicted of child sexual abuse
American prisoners and detainees
American television personalities
Male television personalities
Businesspeople from Indianapolis
Criminals from Indiana
Indiana University Bloomington alumni

Jewish American male actors
Jewish American philanthropists
Prisoners and detainees of the United States federal government
Spokespersons
Subway (restaurant)